Pichilemo is the original spelling of the commune of Pichilemu, Chile.

Pichilemo or Pichilemu may also refer to:

Geography
 San Antonio de Petrel, a Chilean hacienda also known as Pichilemo
 Pichilemu, Valparaíso, a village in the commune of La Ligua, Valparaíso Region

Media
 Pichilemu (newspaper)
 Pichilemu News, an online newspaper published by Washington Saldías González